Barefoot Savage is a 1952 Italian melodrama film directed by Clemente Fracassi.

Cast
 Angelo Binarelli as Marco
 Clorindo Cerato as Farm Hand
 Francesca Liddi as Nidia
 Marcello Mastroianni as Carlo Sartori
 Corrado Nardi as Bosci
 Amedeo Nazzari as Riccardo Sartori
 Eleonora Rossi Drago as Franca Gabrie
 Maria Zanoli as Maid

References

External links

1952 films
1950s Italian-language films
1952 drama films
Italian black-and-white films
Films directed by Clemente Fracassi
Italian drama films
Melodrama films
1950s Italian films